The Internationale Fachmesse für Sportartikel und Sportmode, more commonly referred to as ISPO, is the world's largest trade fair for sporting goods and sportswear.

Description 
Since its inception in 1970, the ISPO takes place once a year (end of January or early February) at Neue Messe München where the following categories are being displayed: Outdoor, Skiing, Boarding, Running, Fitness, Sportswear, Beachwear, Teamsports, Soccer, Nordic Sports, Biking, Racket, Triathlon, and Kids. 
ISPO Munich is part of the ISPO Family which also includes other trade fairs such as ISPO BIKE (previously Bike EXPO), ISPO BEIJING and the service providers ISPO JOBS and ISPO CONNECT.

Each year, the ISPO awards the ISPO BrandNew to Start-Up companies in the sport industry that present especially innovative business models or products. The ISPO has an ISPO Award, which is awarded to particularly innovative, creative, high-performing or ecological products and is voted by an independent jury who convene before the show takes place.

ISPO hosts the annual ISPO Night Run in the Olympiapark, Munich's largest running event at night.

External links 

www.ispo.com - ISPO Website
www.auma.de - Website of the Association of the German Trade Fair Industry 
-ISPO BrandNew Website
- ISPO Major Supplier

References 

Trade fairs in Germany
Tourist attractions in Munich
Sporting goods industry